Zerei Kbrom Mezngi (born 12 January 1986) is an Eritrean-Norwegian long-distance runner. Competing for Norway, he won a silver medal in the 10000 meters at the 2022 European Athletics Championships.

References

External links

1986 births
Living people
Norwegian male long-distance runners
Norwegian Athletics Championships winners
Eritrean emigrants to Norway
European Athletics Championships medalists